Dániel Tőzsér (born 12 May 1985) is a Hungarian professional football official and a former midfielder. He works as a sporting director for Debrecen. He also played for the Hungarian national football team. A left-footed player, he played on the central, defensive or the left side of midfield.

Club career
Dániel Tőzsér graduated through the youth ranks at Debrecen. He managed 1 first team appearance for Debrecen. Tőzsér transferred to Turkey with Galatasaray youth team in 2003, aged 17, but didn't manage to make any appearances for the first team. After one year with the club, Tőzsér moved to Hungarian club Ferencváros.

Ferencváros
Tőzsér signed a professional contract with Ferencváros in what turned out to be a successful two years at the club.  Club manager, Bobby Davison, called Tőzsér the Hungarian Frank Lampard. In total Tőzsér made 54 apps and scored 3 goals over 2 years with the club, before moving to AEK Athens in 2006.

AEK Athens
With AEK Athens, Tőzsér managed 35 appearances and 3 goals. AEK manager Llorenç Serra Ferrer said he had talent and a great future ahead of him. Tőzsér wore the number 88. He scored his first goal against OFI Crete with a stunning strike. Tőzsér also played an important role in AEK's UEFA Champions League run and was voted man of the match against Anderlecht. Following the match and evidently impressed, Anderlecht attempted to sign Tőzsér, however AEK declined the offers. He also gave the assist for the goal of Nikos Liberopoulos against Hearts. After 2 years at the club, he departed to Belgian team Racing Genk.

Genk
On 5 June 2008, Genk announced the signing of Tőzsér on a four-year deal. According to several Greek newspapers the Belgian club paid around €1.500,000. In Genk, Dániel would play alongside fellow Hungarian, Balázs Tóth. He stated that he hoped by doing well at Genk he would regain his place in the Hungarian national team. He also stated that he wanted to win the Belgian title with Genk. On 16 August, he captained his side against Porto in a 4–2 defeat.
On 21 July 2011, Tőzsér won the Belgian Supercup beating Standard Liège. Tőzsér scored the only goal of the match.
On 23 August 2011, Tőzsér and his Hungarian teammate László Köteles played an important role in qualifying for the group stages of the UEFA Champions League 2011–12 season. Genk beat Maccabi Haifa 4-1 on penalties.
On 13 September 2011, Tőzsér debuted in the UEFA Champions League against Valencia. The result was a goalless draw.

Genoa
In February 2012, it was announced that Tözsér would be leaving Genk at the end of the season, with a four-year contract having been agreed with Italian side Genoa. Tözsér struggled for consistency in his first season, making only 22 appearances for the Serie A club. Having fallen out of favour with head coach Gian Piero Gasperini the following season, Tözsér joined long-term admirers Watford on loan.

Watford (loan)
On 29 January 2014, Tőzsér joined Watford on loan for the remainder of the 2013–14 season, with a view to signing a permanent deal. Tőzsér made his Watford debut in a 2–0 win over Brighton on 2 February 2014, playing the full 90 minutes.

Parma
After two years at Genoa, and a loan spell in 2014 with Watford, Tőzsér signed for fellow Serie A side Parma on 5 July 2014 signing a two-year contract.

Return to Watford (loan)
Following his move to Parma in early July as part of the deal that Aleandro Rosi moved to Genoa., Tőzsér returned to Watford on 7 July 2014 signing a two-year loan deal with the option of a third.

He scored his first goal for Watford in a 4–1 win against Leeds United on 23 August 2014.

On 1 November 2014, Tőzsér scored a superb free-kick in the 45th minute against Millwall in a 3–1 victory in the 2014–15 Football League Championship season.

Tőzsér was cited as the Watford's unsung hero of the 2014–15 Football League Championship by the journalist of Here Is The City.

Despite playing a crucial role in Watford's promotion to the Premier League, Tőzsér announced he would be leaving the club early, just one year into a two-year loan from Parma.

Queens Park Rangers
On 28 August 2015, Tőzsér completed a move to QPR on a two-year deal. The first of two of Watford's promotion winning side to sign for QPR during the summer transfer window. He scored his first goal for QPR in a 1–1 draw with Sheffield Wednesday on 23 February 2016.

Career statistics

International career

Tőzsér made his international debut on 14 December 2005 against Mexico. Tőzsér scored his first international goal against Malta during a Euro 2008 Qualifier, putting Hungary two goals in front with a stunning free kick.

International goals
Scores and results list Hungary's goal tally first.

Personal life
Tőzsér married on 21 June 2008 to Zsanett Lénárt. On 3 September 2011, Tőzsér appeared on the breakfast football show Soccer AM.

Honours
Belgian Cup: 2008–09
Belgian Pro League: 2010–11
Belgian Super Cup: 2011

References

External links
 
Dániel Tőzsér fan site (In English)
Daniel Tözser's Galatasaray Career (In Turkish)

1985 births
Living people
Hungarian footballers
Hungary international footballers
Hungary under-21 international footballers
Hungarian expatriate footballers
People from Szolnok
Association football midfielders
AEK Athens F.C. players
Debreceni VSC players
Ferencvárosi TC footballers
Galatasaray S.K. footballers
K.R.C. Genk players
Genoa C.F.C. players
Watford F.C. players
Queens Park Rangers F.C. players
Parma Calcio 1913 players
English Football League players
Super League Greece players
Belgian Pro League players
Serie A players
Nemzeti Bajnokság I players
Expatriate footballers in Belgium
Expatriate footballers in England
Expatriate footballers in Greece
Expatriate footballers in Italy
Expatriate footballers in Turkey
Hungarian expatriate sportspeople in Belgium
Hungarian expatriate sportspeople in England
Hungarian expatriate sportspeople in Greece
Hungarian expatriate sportspeople in Italy
Hungarian expatriate sportspeople in Turkey
Sportspeople from Jász-Nagykun-Szolnok County